The 2019 World Modern Pentathlon Championships were held in Budapest, Hungary from 2 to 9 September 2019. 

The 59th edition of the championships, and the 23rd in which the men's and women's events have been combined, the individual competitions also operate as a direct qualification event for the Modern pentathlon at the 2020 Summer Olympics, with three quota places available in each event

Medal table

Medal summary

Men

Women

Mixed

Olympic qualification

The individual events at the 2019 Championships doubled as a direct Olympic Games qualifier event. The following athletes achieved qualification for the Modern pentathlon event in Tokyo 2020 by achieving a top three finish in their respective individual event:

References

External links
Results

World Modern Pentathlon Championships
World Championships
2019 in Hungarian sport
Modern Pentathlon Championships
World Modern Pentathlon Championships